Chandra Kala Thapa (born September 2, 1980 in Urlabari, Morang District) is a track and field sprint athlete who competes internationally for Nepal.

Thapa represented Nepal at the 2008 Summer Olympics in Beijing. She competed at the 100 metres sprint and placed 9th in her heat without advancing to the second round. She ran the distance in a time of 13.15 seconds.

References

External links
 

1980 births
Living people
People from Morang District
Nepalese female sprinters
Olympic athletes of Nepal
Athletes (track and field) at the 2008 Summer Olympics
Athletes (track and field) at the 2010 Asian Games
World Athletics Championships athletes for Nepal
Asian Games competitors for Nepal
Olympic female sprinters
21st-century Nepalese women